Kenneth Waterhouse (23 January 1930 – 4 April 2016) was a professional footballer who played in the Football League for Preston North End, Rotherham United, Bristol City and Darlington. He was a member of Rotherham's 1961 Football League Cup Final team. Waterhouse became manager of Morecambe in 1965 and left in 1969. However just several months later he was back at The Shrimps where he spent another two years.

References

External links
 KEN WATERHOUSE  1965 -1969 & 1970 - 1972 

1930 births
2016 deaths
People from Ormskirk
English footballers
Association football wing halves
Burscough F.C. players
Preston North End F.C. players
Rotherham United F.C. players
Bristol City F.C. players
Darlington F.C. players
English Football League players
English football managers
Morecambe F.C. managers